Damian Harris,  also known by his stage name Midfield General, is the original founder of the Skint Records label.

Midfield General is the recording alias of Skint label boss Damian Harris. A prime architect of the sound of big beat, Harris grew up listening first to punk rock, later hip hop, and acid house. He then moved to Brighton to study art, eventually taking work as a DJ while promoting clubs around the city. In 1994, his music knowledge landed him a job at Loaded Records, where former Housemartins member Norman Cook - a friend of Harris' since his days working at the Rounder store in Brighton - recorded as Pizzaman. He is a fan of Arsenal F.C and uses his season ticket at the Emirates Stadium. He has also appeared on episodes of the It's Up For Grabs Now and Tuesday Club - Arsenal podcasts with Alan Davies and Ian Stone. He also released a song called "Midfielding" featuring a monologue from surrealist and comedian Noel Fielding.

Discography

Studio albums
Generalisation (2000)
General Disarray (2008)

Live albums
On the Floor at the Boutique – Volume 3 (2000)

Singles

'Devil In Sports Casual'
"We were in New York for a record company schmooze," recalled Harris, "and Lindy Layton was there as well, going round recording people talking in the streets. She came back very excited because she'd found this guy ranting in Times Square and mentioning 'Damien'. For the title, I wanted some devil reference because since those fucking Omen films came out I've had people calling me that. The film Devil in a Blue Dress had just come out and I just altered that. A lot of people would take the piss out of me for wearing sports casual gear – which I still claim I looked ace in. I was just ahead of the times!"

References

External links 
Midfield General's discography at Discogs

English electronic music groups
Musical groups from London
Musical groups established in 1997